Paracanoeing at the 2024 Summer Paralympics in Paris, France will take place at Vaires-sur-Marne Nautical Stadium, it will also be the same venue that will host rowing. This is the third appearance of the paracanoe in the Summer Paralympics. There will be five events for both men and women, three in kayak and two in va'a in each category.

Qualification
100 slots (50 male, 50 female) are allocated. An NPC can enter a maximum of one eligible canoeist per medal event and a maximum of five male and five female slots.

Medalists

Men

Women

See also
Canoeing at the 2024 Summer Olympics

References

2024 Summer Paralympics events
Paracanoe at the Summer Paralympics
Canoeing and kayaking competitions in France